Elmer Stephen Kelton (April 29, 1926 – August 22, 2009) was an American journalist and writer, known particularly for his Western novels. His pseudonyms are: Tom Early, Alex Hawk, and Lee McElroy

Early life
Kelton was born at a place called Horse Camp on the Five Wells Ranch, owned by the Scharbauer Cattle Company,  in Andrews County — just east of the city of Andrews, Texas. His parents were Robert William "Buck" Kelton- (30 June 1901 – 15 June 1980)  and Neta Beatrice "Bea" (née Parker). 15 May 1904 – 27 April 1993) Kelton.

When Kelton was three years old, his family moved to the McElroy Ranch located in the counties of Crane and Upton, Texas, near the city of Crane, south-southwest of Midland.  He spent the rest of his childhood at three different homesteads on the McElroy Ranch, where his father was employed for 36 years.

After graduation from Crane High School, Kelton attended the University of Texas at Austin, in 1942–1944 and again from 1946–1948, when he earned a Bachelor of Arts degree in journalism. From 1944 to 1946, Kelton had served in the U.S. Army, with combat infantry experience in Europe during World War II.

Career
From 1948-1963, Kelton was the farm-and-ranch editor for the San Angelo Standard-Times in the Harte-Hanks chain. For five years, he was editor of Sheep and Goat Raiser Magazine and another 22 years he was editor of Livestock Weekly, from which he retired in 1990.

His memoir, Sandhills Boy, was published in 2007.

Three of his novels have been featured in Reader's Digest Condensed Books.

Seven Kelton novels, Buffalo Wagons, The Day the Cowboys Quit, The Time It Never Rained, Eyes of the Hawk, Slaughter, The Far Canyon, and The Way of the Coyote, have won Spur Awards from the Western Writers of America. Peers in the WWA also named him as the greatest Western writer of all time.

Three other novels, The Time It Never Rained, The Good Old Boys, and The Man Who Rode Midnight, have received Western Heritage Awards from the National Cowboy & Western Heritage Museum in Oklahoma City, Oklahoma.

The Good Old Boys was made into the Turner Network Television TV movie named The Good Old Boys (1995) starring Tommy Lee Jones.

In 1977, Kelton received an Owen Wister Award for lifetime achievement (named for Owen Wister, the author of The Virginian). In April 1997, the Texas State Legislature proclaimed "Elmer Kelton Day". In 1998, he received the first Lone Star Award for Lifetime Achievement from the Larry McMurtry Center for Arts and Humanities at Midwestern State University in Wichita Falls.

Kelton received honorary doctorates from Hardin-Simmons University in Abilene and Texas Tech University at Lubbock. Kelton also received a lifetime achievement award from the National Cowboy Symposium in Lubbock.  He is honored with a star in the sidewalk at the Fort Worth Stockyards in Fort Worth.

Personal life
Kelton was married to Anni Lipp, a native of Austria. They had three children. One son, Gerhard (also known as "Gary") of Plainview, is Anni's son who was adopted by Kelton. The other son and a daughter are Steve Kelton and Kathy Kelton, both of San Angelo.  He also had three brothers, Merle Kelton and his wife, Ann, of May, Texas; Bill Kelton and his wife, Pat, of Atlanta, Texas; and Eugene Kelton and his wife, Peggy, of McCamey, Texas.

Kelton was working on another book, but was facing several health problems in early 2009. The book had not been completed before he died on August 22, 2009, from natural causes.

His funeral was held on August 27, 2009, at the First United Methodist Church in San Angelo. A life-sized statue of Kelton by Raul Ruiz is displayed at the Stevens Central Library in San Angelo.

Beginning in 2014, the Academy of Western Artists, based in Gene Autry, Oklahoma, awarded the first of its annual Elmer Kelton book awards to successful authors in the categories of fiction and nonfiction.

Awards

Bibliography
Partial list of works:

 Barbed Wire (1957)
 Buffalo Wagons (1957)
 Shadow of a Star (1958)
 Texas Rifles (1960)
 Donovan (1961)
 Massacre at Goliad (1965)
 After the Bugles (1967)
 Llano River (1968)
 The Day the Cowboys Quit (1971)
 Wagontongue (1972)
 The Time it Never Rained (1973)
 The Wolf and the Buffalo (1980)
 Dark Thicket (1985)
 Honor at Daybreak (1991)
 Slaughter (1992)
 The Far Canyon (1994)
 The Pumpkin Rollers (1996)
 Cloudy in the West (1997)
 The Smiling Country (1998)
 Way of the Coyote (2001)
 Jericho's Road (2004)
 Six Bits a Day (2005)
 Ranger's Law: A Lone Star Saga (2006)
 The Rebels: Sons of Texas (2007)
 Many A River (2009)

Texas Ranger Novels:

 The Buckskin Line
 Badger Boy
 The Way of the Coyote
 Ranger's Trail
 Texas Vendetta
 Jericho's Road
 Hard Trail to Follow
 Other Men's Horses
 Texas Standoff

See also
Museum of the Desert Southwest, which has an exhibit on Kelton

References

External links

elmerkelton.net, Kelton's official website
Elmer Kelton's page. - Macmillan.com
The Story of Elmer Kelton
Kelton's papers, 1948-1985. - Southwest Collection/Special Collections Library at Texas Tech University
Wall Street Journal on Elmer Kelton
Elmer Kelton interview with Bradley D. Pettit. - AmericanCowboy.com
Texas Rangers Audiobooks - GraphicAudio.net

American editors
American male novelists
United States Army personnel of World War II
People from Andrews County, Texas
People from Crane County, Texas
People from San Angelo, Texas
People from Upton County, Texas
Journalists from Texas
Moody College of Communication alumni
United States Army soldiers
American Western (genre) novelists
Novelists from Texas
1926 births
2009 deaths
20th-century American novelists
21st-century American novelists
20th-century American male writers
21st-century American male writers
20th-century American non-fiction writers
21st-century American non-fiction writers
American male non-fiction writers
20th-century American journalists
American male journalists